W. Todd Longanacre (born October 19, 1967) is an American politician serving as a member of the West Virginia House of Delegates from the 42nd district. He assumed office on December 1, 2020.

Education 
Longanacre graduated from Seneca Trail Christian Academy in 1987. He earned an Associate of Science in forestry technology and Bachelor of Science in biology from Glenville State College, followed by a Master of Science in strategic leadership from Mountain State University.

Career 
From 1986 to 2015, Longanacre served in the United States Army. During his tenure, he was assigned to the 101st Airborne Division. From 1995 to 2001, Longanacre served as a naturalist and wildlife manager in the West Virginia Division of Natural Resources. He also owns a pizza restaurant and works as a survival skills instructor. Longanacre was elected to the West Virginia House of Delegates in November 2020 and assumed office the following month.

References 

1967 births
Living people
Glenville State College alumni
Mountain State University alumni
Republican Party members of the West Virginia House of Delegates
People from Greenbrier County, West Virginia